The 1990–91 Romanian Hockey League season was the 61st season of the Romanian Hockey League. Six teams participated in the league, and Steaua Bucuresti won the championship.

Regular season

External links
hochei.net

1990–91
Romanian
Rom